Minecraft is a franchise developed from and centered around the video game of the same name. Primarily developed by Mojang Studios, the franchise consists of five video games, along with various books, merchandise, events, and an upcoming theatrical film. Microsoft acquired Mojang Studios in 2014, alongside the Minecraft franchise and its editions.

Minecraft 

Minecraft is a 3D survival sandbox game developed and published by Mojang, spanning multiple platforms. It was originally created by the independent video game designer Markus Persson in 2009, before giving the development to Jens Bergensten in 2011. The game has no specific goals to accomplish, allowing players a large amount of freedom in choosing how to play the game. Gameplay is in the first-person perspective, with the core gameplay modes being survival, in which players must acquire resources to build the world and maintain health (optionally with a "hardcore" limit, which deletes the world after the player dies); and creative, in which players have unlimited resources, never hunger and are able to fly. The game world is composed of voxels—cubes, commonly called "blocks"—representing various materials, such as dirt, stone, ores, tree trunks, water, and lava, which are arranged in a 3-dimensional grid. Gameplay revolves around picking up and placing these objects as the player pleases, while being able to move freely around the world.

Spin-off games

Minecraft: Story Mode 

Minecraft: Story Mode, an episodic spin-off game developed by Telltale Games in collaboration with Mojang, was announced in December 2014. Consisting of five episodes plus three additional downloadable episodes, the standalone game is a narrative and player choice-driven, and it was released on Windows, OS X, iOS, PlayStation 3, PlayStation 4, Xbox 360, and Xbox One via download on 13 October 2015. A physical disc that grants access to all episodes was released for the aforementioned four consoles on 27 October. Wii U and Nintendo Switch versions were available in 2017. Since 25 June 2019, it is only available on Netflix, where only the first five episodes are available. The first trailer for the game was shown at Minecon on 4 July 2015, revealing some of the game's features. In Minecraft: Story Mode, players control Jesse (voiced by Patton Oswalt and Catherine Taber), who sets out on a journey with his or her friends to find The Order of the Stone—four adventurers who slayed an Ender Dragon—in order to save their world. Brian Posehn, Ashley Johnson, Scott Porter, Martha Plimpton, Dave Fennoy, Corey Feldman, Billy West and Paul Reubens portray the rest of the cast.

Minecraft: Story Mode: Season 2 
The second season was released from July to December 2017. It continued the story from the first season, with the player's choices affecting elements within Season Two. Patton Oswalt, Catherine Taber, Ashley Johnson, and Scott Porter were confirmed to continue voicework for the new season. The game supports the new Crowd Play feature that Telltale introduced in Batman: The Telltale Series, allowing up to 2,000 audience members to vote on decisions for the player using Twitch or other streaming services. It was shut down along with the original Minecraft: Story Mode, on 25 June 2019.

Minecraft Earth 

Minecraft Earth was an augmented reality sandbox game developed by Mojang Studios and published by Xbox Game Studios. A spin-off of the video game Minecraft, it was first announced in May 2019, and was available on Android, iOS, and iPadOS. The game allowed players to interact with the world and build Minecraft-style structures and objects that will persist and can be modified by other players. The game implemented the resource-gathering and many of the other features of the original game in an augmented-reality setting. The game had a beta release in July 2019. The game was free-to-play, and was released in early access in October 2019. The game was shut down on 30 June 2021 and players who made in-game purchases on the app received a free copy of the Bedrock Edition.

Minecraft Dungeons 

Minecraft Dungeons is a dungeon crawler video game developed by Mojang Studios and Double Eleven. It was published by Xbox Game Studios. It is a spin-off of Minecraft and was released for Nintendo Switch, PlayStation 4, Windows, and Xbox One on 26 May 2020. The game received mixed reviews; many deemed the game fun and charming, with praise for its visuals and music. However, its simple gameplay and use of procedural generation received a more mixed reception, with its short story and lack of depth criticized.
It is a hack and slash-styled dungeon crawler, rendered from an isometric perspective. Players explore procedurally generated and hand crafted dungeons filled with new variants of existing Minecraft monsters and also deal with traps, puzzles, bosses and finding treasure.

Minecraft Dungeons Arcade
In early 2021, Mojang announced an arcade adaptation version of Minecraft Dungeons associated with collectible cards.

Minecraft Legends 

Minecraft Legends is an upcoming action-strategy game developed by Mojang Studios and Blackbird Interactive, announced on 12 June 2022 and set to be released on 18 April 2023.

Films

Minecraft: The Story of Mojang 

A documentary about the development of Mojang and Minecraft was released in December 2012. Titled Minecraft: The Story of Mojang, the film was produced by 2 Player Productions.

Untitled Minecraft film 
In 2012, Mojang received offers from Hollywood producers who wanted to produce Minecraft-related TV shows; however, Mojang stated they would only engage in such projects when "the right idea comes along."  

Two years later, in February 2014, an attempt to crowdfund a fan film through Kickstarter was shut down after Markus 'Notch' Persson declined to let the filmmakers use the license, the given reason being that the Kickstarter was set up before any agreement with Mojang had been made. That same month Persson revealed that Mojang was in talks with Warner Bros. Pictures regarding an official Minecraft film, which would be produced by Roy Lee and Jill Messick and was "in its early days of development" by October of that year. The film was initially going to be directed by Shawn Levy and written by Kieran Mulroney and Michele Mulroney, but they all dropped out in December.

In July 2015, Warner Bros. hired Rob McElhenney to direct the film. According to McElhenney, he had been drawn to the film based on the open-world nature of the game, an idea Warner Bros. had initially agreed with and provided him with a preliminary US$150 million budget for. In 2016, early production started on the film, including having had given a release date of 24 May 2019 in June, Jason Fuchs set to write the script in October, and Steve Carell contracted to star in November. McElhenney's Minecraft film "slowly died on the vine," and due to scheduling conflicts, he left the film in August 2018, and Fuchs was replaced with Aaron and Adam Nee, resulting in a delayed release date.

In January 2019, Peter Sollett was announced to write and direct the film, featuring an entirely different story from McElhenney's version. In June 2019, Allison Schroeder was hired to write the script and co-write the film with Sollett. The film was scheduled to be released in theaters on 4 March 2022. However, due to the ongoing COVID-19 pandemic, Warner Bros. removed the film from their release schedule in October 2020. Sollett instead directed Metal Lords, which was released exclusively on Netflix in April 2022. That same month, production on the Minecraft film was announced to be moving forward without Sollett and Schroeder, now with Jared Hess set to direct and Jason Momoa in early talks to star. The film was also confirmed to be live action.

Books

Official novels 
The game has inspired several officially licensed novels set in the Minecraft universe:

Other books 
 Minecraft: The Unlikely Tale of Markus "Notch" Persson and the Game That Changed Everything is a book written by Daniel Goldberg and Linus Larsson (and translated by Jennifer Hawkins) about the story of Minecraft and its creator, Markus "Notch" Persson. The book was released on 17 October 2013.
 A graphic novel set in the Minecraft franchise, Trayaurus and the Enchanted Crystal, was published by YouTuber DanTDM in October 2016, reaching the first spot on The New York Times Best Seller list for hardcover graphic books and remaining there for eleven consecutive weeks.
 Gameknight999 is a series of six trilogies about a protagonist who is transported into the digital Minecraft world and experiences harrowing adventures involving the antagonist Herobrine. The first trilogy was listed in the New York Times top 10 bestsellers in February 2015.

Tabletop games 
Three tabletop games have been produced as official tie-in games for Minecraft. The first two are both card games, namely Minecraft Card Game?, produced by Mattel in 2015, and Uno Minecraft, produced by Mattel in 2016.

Towards the end of 2019, Minecraft: Builders & Biomes, a board game version of Minecraft, was announced. The game was geared towards the family market, catered for 2–4 players, and was published by Ravensburger. Players explore the Overworld, build structures, and mine resources in a quest to score the most points. At the end of 2020, an expansion for the tabletop game was released, titled Minecraft: Farmer's Market Expansion, which introduced a new farm biome that enabled players to produce vegetables.

Merchandise

Lego Minecraft 
The first Lego set based on Minecraft was released on 6 June 2012. The set, called "Micro World", centres around a microscale representation of a forest from the game and includes Lego versions of the game's default player character and a creeper. Mojang submitted the concept of Minecraft merchandise to Lego in December 2011 for the Lego Cuusoo program, from which it quickly received 10,000 votes by users, prompting Lego to review the concept. Lego Cuusoo approved the concept in January 2012 and began developing sets based on Minecraft. Two more sets based on the Nether and village areas of the game were released on 1 September 2013. A fourth Micro World set, the End, was released in June 2014. Six more, larger Lego minifigure scale, sets became available November 2014, with more released every year since.

Other merchandise 
Mojang often collaborates with Jinx, an online game merchandise store, to sell Minecraft merchandise, such as clothing, foam pickaxes, and toys of creatures in the game. By May 2012, over 1 million dollars were made from Minecraft merchandise sales. T-shirts and socks were the most popular products. In March 2013 Mojang signed a deal with the Egmont Group, a children's book publisher, to create Minecraft handbooks, annuals, poster books, and magazines. As part for the Steve DLC for Super Smash Bros. Ultimate, Masahiro Sakurai said that an Amiibo for Steve might be made by Nintendo in the future. The Amiibo has a page on the Nintendo UK Website.

Events

Minecon 
Minecon (stylized as "MineCon" or "MINECON") is an official convention dedicated to Minecraft. The first one was held in November 2011 at the Mandalay Bay Hotel and Casino in Las Vegas. All 4,500 tickets for MineCon 2011 were sold out by 31 October. The event included the official launch of Minecraft; keynote speeches, including one by Persson; building and costume contests; Minecraft-themed breakout classes; exhibits by leading gaming and Minecraft-related companies; commemorative merchandise; and autograph and picture times with Mojang employees and well-known contributors from the Minecraft community. After MineCon, there was an Into The Nether after-party with deadmau5. Free codes were given to every attendee of MineCon that unlocked alpha versions of Mojang's Scrolls, as well as an additional non-Mojang game, Cobalt, developed by Oxeye Game Studios. Similar events occurred in MineCon 2012, which took place in Disneyland Paris in November. The tickets for the 2012 event sold out in less than two hours. MineCon 2013 was held in Orlando in November. MineCon 2015 was held in London in July. MineCon 2016 was held in Anaheim in September. MineCon 2017 was held as a livestream instead of being held at a show floor. Titled "MINECON Earth", it was streamed live in November.

MineCon Earth 2018 followed the same format as the 2017 event, but was renamed in 2019 to "MINECON Live" to avoid confusion with Mojang's augmented-reality game, Minecraft Earth.

Minecraft Festival 
In MineCon Live 2019, Mojang announced a new convention, called Minecraft Festival. It was announced would be an in-person event to be held 25–27 September 2020, in Orlando, Florida. The event has since been delayed indefinitely due to the COVID-19 pandemic.

Minecraft Live 
On 3 September 2020, it was announced by Mojang that a new livestreamed event would be taking place to replace the postponed Minecraft Festival. It took place on 3 October 2020, showing the features of Minecraft's "Caves and Cliffs" update. The second Minecraft Live took place on 16 October 2021 and showcased more of the Caves and Cliffs part 2 update, along with announcing and showing of features for the Wild Update. The third Minecraft Live took place on 15 October 2022 and announced more of the features in the Wild Update and the as yet unnamed next update.

Notable achievements 
The Minecraft franchise covers a wide range of content. In late 2021, videos of Minecraft hit 1 trillion views on YouTube. The Minecraft video game is known as the best-selling video game of all time surpassing Tetris and Grand Theft Auto V with over 238,000,000 copies sold as seen on List of best-selling video games.

References 

 
Microsoft franchises
Video game franchises introduced in 2011
Markus Persson